Mabel Todd (August 13, 1907 – June 2, 1977) was an American actress.

Early years
Todd was from Glendale and attended the University of Southern California.

Career 
Todd performed in vaudeville as a singer, dancer, and comedienne.

Todd appeared in films such as Varsity Show, Over the Goal, Hollywood Hotel, Gold Diggers in Paris, Garden of the Moon, The Cowboy and the Lady, The Mysterious Miss X, Mystery of the White Room, Street of Missing Men, Blues in the Night, The Talk of the Town, The Ghost and the Guest, In Society, A Wave, a WAC and a Marine, Down Missouri Way and Wife Wanted, among others.

Personal life 
In 1932, Todd married Morey Amsterdam. They divorced in 1945. She married Matthew A. Santino on November 14, 1947, in Las Vegas, and they divorced on April 28, 1950.

On June 2, 1977, Todd died in Los Angeles, California. Todd is buried at Queen of Heaven Cemetery in Rowland Heights, California.

Filmography

Film

References

External links
 
 Mabel Todd at allmovie.com
 Mabel Todd at tcm.turner.com
 Mabel Todd at fandango.com

1907 births
1977 deaths
20th-century American actresses
American film actresses
Actresses from California
Vaudeville performers
University of Southern California alumni